Star is an American celebrity tabloid magazine founded in 1974. The magazine is owned by American Media Inc. and overseen by AMI's Chief Content Officer, Dylan Howard.

History
Star was founded by Rupert Murdoch in 1974 as competition to the tabloid National Enquirer with its headquarters in New York City. In the late 1980s it moved its offices to Tarrytown, NY and in 1990 Murdoch sold the magazine to the Enquirers parent company American Media, Inc. (Murdoch now owns the New York Post, which, although it has more of a regional, news-centered focus, still has significant celebrity coverage.)

Originally an unstapled, inexpensive, supermarket tabloid printed on newsprint, Star was hugely successful but remained in the shadow of its longer-established stablemate. Along with the Enquirer its circulation declined with the advent of celebrity-driven television shows such as Entertainment Tonight and Hard Copy.

In 1999, AMI was bought by investors fronted by David Pecker, who personally pledged that Star would never relocate to Florida, the home state of all the country's other tabloids. However, it took Pecker less than a year to renege on his promise and Star was moved into AMI's headquarters in Boca Raton, Florida, sharing the building with the Enquirer and AMI's other recently acquired titles The Globe, National Examiner, and Sun. Editor Phil Bunton was replaced before the move when he angered Pecker by telling the New York Post: "It's going to be open warfare. How we're going to all work together I don't know. It's like having the Bosnians, Croats, the Jews and Arabs all together in the same area." Virtually all Stars  staff of experienced tabloid journalists refused to make the move south. Four years later, Pecker appointed former Us Weekly editor Bonnie Fuller to oversee the paper and, at her demand, he moved it back to New York in the summer of 2003.

At the beginning of 2004, Star gained new life by switching to a more traditional magazine format, with a higher grade of paper and, denying its tabloid roots, put itself into competition with a new breed of entertainment magazine typified by Time Inc.'s People, Fuller's former publication, Wenner Media's Us Weekly,  and the German-owned magazine publisher Bauer's In Touch Weekly. However, its page layout remains tabloid-derived, with sections including "Worst of the Week", which points out the most amusing celebrity fashion disasters of the previous week, "Stars Without Makeup" section which compares photos of stars with and without makeup, and "Knifestyles of the Rich and Famous" section, which illustrates suspected incidences of plastic surgery with before-and-after photos.

As of 2015, Star sells for US$4.99 per issue with reduced rate subscriptions varying from 26 to 52 issues.

Controversies 
Star received attention in 1991 in for running a story about KISS drummer Peter Criss, claiming that he had become homeless and was a habitual drunkard and was living on the streets of Santa Monica, California. In fact, Criss was healthy and happily married at the time. Star had instead interviewed and photographed a homeless man who had passed himself as Criss for years. The real Peter Criss was mourning his mother at the time and was distressed to learn that his friends and associates believed he had fallen on hard times.

In 2011, the actress Katie Holmes sued Star magazine for libel after the tabloid published a story about her that suggested she abused drugs. The original lawsuit was for $50 million, but the case was settled before going into court for an undisclosed amount of money. The publisher took matters into print again publicly apologizing to Holmes and disclosing that a substantial donation was going to be done under her name to a charity of her choice.

It was said by Star magazine's chief editor that brand loyalty is the most important focus for their industry. This being said, people are only intrigued by the "juiciest dirt", leaving the cover page to be where the most gossip, dirt, and biggest celebrity news is to be shown, leaving the audience wanting more. Star has been accused of publicizing any news that is presented to them, regardless of whether or not it is true. This left Jennifer Aniston stating that "if you cooperate with one of the magazines, their competitors become vengeful and attack clients. There is no upside to working with them…. Their tactic is to make up stories that are so damaging", which is why she no longer holds interest in talking to reporters, specifically from Star magazine.

References

External links
StarMagazine.com

Celebrity magazines published in the United States
Weekly magazines published in the United States
Magazines established in 1974
Supermarket tabloids
Magazines published in New York City